Matt Scott is a British sports journalist.

He is best known for his work in The Guardian newspaper in the 'Digger' column which was printed between 2007 and 2010. He was also an occasional contributor to the Guardian's Football Weekly podcast. He vacated his position at The Guardian in January 2011, having been employed there since 2003. Since then he has written for the Daily Telegraph and is a columnist for the website Inside World Football (IWF).

He had previously worked for Sportsbeat, Worldsports and the Daily Star.

A known Arsenal F.C. fan,  he is the great grandson of William Scott; a former player of Arsenal and Forfar Athletic.

References

English sports journalists
Alumni of King's College London
Living people
Year of birth missing (living people)